La Yaguara is a Caracas Metro station on Line 2. It was opened on 4 October 1987 as part of the inaugural section of Line 2 from La Paz to Las Adjuntas and Zoológico. The station is between La Paz and Carapita.

References

Caracas Metro stations
1987 establishments in Venezuela
Railway stations opened in 1987